Bernard O'Callaghan (1939–1998) was an Irish Gaelic football manager, selector and player. His league and championship career with the Kerry senior team spanned six seasons from 1961 to 1966.

The Bernard O'Callaghan Memorial Senior Football Championship was renamed in his honor in 2000.

References

1939 births
1998 deaths
Moyvane Gaelic footballers
Kerry inter-county Gaelic footballers
Munster inter-provincial Gaelic footballers